In the Flesh: three lives in prostitution is a 2003 independent documentary by Bishakha Datta about the lives of three Indian sex workers, written for a family audience.  It is a low-budget film set in Calcutta and Mumbai that describes the everyday life of its subjects.

It was filmed in 2000, and released in India in 2002, before an international release in 2003.  The subjects of the documentary were chosen with help from the Durbar Mahila Samanwaya Committee (a Calcutta sex worker collective) and at Calcutta's Sex Workers Mela, an annual event held in the city's Salt Lake Stadium that attracts over 10,000 people a day.

Plot 
In The Flesh follows three sex workers: Shabana (who works the highways near Mumbai), Bhaskar (a hijra who sells sex to men in Calcutta), and Uma (a former theater actress who lives in a Calcutta brothel). The film follows their daily routines, from picking up customers and sex to their private social lives to violence and activism.

History and reception 
The idea for the film came about while Datta and Point of View were researching a report for the grassroots organization Sangram about its work with sex workers over the previous 10 years.

After its Indian release in 2002, it was screened internationally in 2003:
 Global Visions Film and Video Festival, Canada 2003
 Three Continents Human Rights Film Festival, Cape Town, South Africa 2003
 South Asia Human Rights Film and Video Festival, New York 2003
 International Video Festival, Trivandrum 2003

References

External links 
 Indieflix has a short clip and stills online.

2003 films
Indian independent films
Indian documentary films
Documentary films about prostitution in India
Documentary films about women in India
Films set in Kolkata
English-language Indian films
Films set in Mumbai
2000s English-language films